Turtle River may refer to:

Rivers

Canada
 Turtle River (Manitoba), a tributary of Dauphin Lake
 Turtle River, near Ignace, Ontario
 Rivière à la Tortue or Turtle River, Quebec

United States
 Turtle River (Georgia)
 Turtle River (Bowstring River tributary), Minnesota
 Turtle River (Mississippi River tributary), Minnesota
 Turtle River (North Dakota)
 Turtle River State Park
 Turtle River (Wisconsin)

Settlements
 Rural Municipality of Turtle River No. 469, Saskatchewan, Canada
 Turtle River, Minnesota, US